Kurdula is a registration area in Gudu Local Government, Sokoto state. With its headquarters in Kurdula town, the area consist many towns, villages and settlements.

Kurdula town is also headquartered to Kurdula district which consist three registration areas. i.e. Awulkiti, Tullun-Doya and Kurdula itself.

References

Local Government Areas in Sokoto State